|}

The Weatherbys Super Sprint is a flat horse race in Great Britain open to two-year-old thoroughbreds. It is run at Newbury over a distance of 5 furlongs and 34 yards (1,037 metres), and it is scheduled to take place each year in July.

History
The event was established in 1991, and it was initially called the Newbury Sales Super Sprint Trophy. It was designed for horses sold as yearlings by public auction for less than a specified price. The concept was devised by Lord Carnarvon and Richard Hannon Sr.

The weight carried by a horse in the Weatherbys Super Sprint is determined by its sale price, with one pound deducted for each £5,000 below the maximum value.

Records
Leading jockey (2 wins):
 Michael Roberts – Lyric Fantasy (1992), Good Girl (2001)
 Michael Hills – Brief Glimpse (1994), Superstar Leo (2000)
 Richard Hughes - Monsieur Chevalier (2009), Tiggy Wiggy (2014)
 Sean Levey -  Happy Romance (2020), Gubbass (2021) 

Leading trainer (7 wins):
 Richard Hannon Sr. – Lyric Fantasy (1992), Risky (1993), Miss Stamper (1996), Presto Vento (2002), If Paradise (2003), Lady Livius (2005), Monsieur Chevalier (2009)

Winners
 Weights given in stones and pounds.

See also
 Horse racing in Great Britain
 List of British flat horse races

References

 Racing Post:
 galopp-sieger.de – Weatherbys Super Sprint.

Flat races in Great Britain
Newbury Racecourse
Flat horse races for two-year-olds
Recurring sporting events established in 1991
1991 establishments in England